is a Japanese retired football player. He played for Japan national team.

Club career
Nagata was born in Shizuoka on 6 April 1983. After graduating from Shizuoka Gakuen High School, he joined J1 League club Kashiwa Reysol in 2002. He debuted in September 2002 and became a regular center back in 2003. However he injured his anterior cruciate ligament in March 2005. Although he came back in November, Reysol was relegated to J2 League end of 2005 season. In 2006, Nagata moved to J1 club Albirex Niigata with teammate Kisho Yano. However Nagata could not play at all in the match for injuries in 2006. He became a regular player in 2007 and played many matches as center back with Mitsuru Chiyotanda (2007-2009) and Kazuhiko Chiba (2010). In 2011, Nagata moved to Urawa Reds with teammate Márcio Richardes. He became a regular center back from first season. However he could not play many matches for repeated injuries from 2013. In 2017, he moved to J2 club Tokyo Verdy. Although he played for the club in 2 seasons, he could hardly play in the match and resigned end of 2018 season. Nagata joined Tokyo United FC on 15 May 2019.

National team career
Nagata was a participant at 2003 World Youth Championship in United Arab Emirates. He was called up to senior national team in 2004. He made his full international debut on 2 September 2010 in a friendly match against Guatemala. He was also selected in the national squad for the 2011 Asian Cup finals as a late replacement for injured Tomoaki Makino. He played 2 games for Japan until 2011.

Club statistics

1Includes other competitive competitions, including the J. League promotion/relegation series.

National team statistics

Appearances in major competitions

Honours

Japan
AFC Asian Cup: 1
 2011

Urawa Reds
J.League Cup: 1
 2016

Individual
AFC U-19 Championship Best Eleven: 1
 2002

References

External links
 
 
 
 
 Japan National Football Team Database

1983 births
Living people
Association football people from Shizuoka Prefecture
Japanese footballers
Japan youth international footballers
Japan international footballers
J1 League players
J2 League players
Kashiwa Reysol players
Albirex Niigata players
Urawa Red Diamonds players
Tokyo Verdy players
Tokyo United FC players
2011 AFC Asian Cup players
AFC Asian Cup-winning players
Association football defenders